"Broken Hearted Me" is a song written by Randy Goodrum, originally recorded by England Dan & John Ford Coley earlier that year, for their album Dr. Heckle and Mr. Jive,  and later covered by Canadian country and  pop music singer Anne Murray.  It was released in September 1979 as the first single from her album I'll Always Love You.  The song reached No. 1 on the Billboard Hot Country Singles chart in December, Murray's fourth No. 1 single on that chart. She also recorded a version of the song in Spanish, which was released on vinyl, and later on CD.

In addition, "Broken Hearted Me" just missed the Top 10 on the Hot 100 chart, where it peaked at No. 12. Three of her other singles —  "A Love Song", "I Just Fall in Love Again" and "Daydream Believer" — also reached the same summit on the Hot 100. On the Billboard Adult Contemporary Singles chart, "Broken Hearted Me" spent five weeks at No. 1 during the late fall of 1979. In doing so, Murray had her fifth No. 1 AC hit.

In her home country, the song reached No. 15 on the Canadian Pop chart; No. 1 on the Adult Contemporary chart; and it became Murray's twelfth No. 1 song on the Canadian Country chart.

Chart performance

Weekly charts

Year-end charts

References

1979 singles
Songs written by Randy Goodrum
England Dan & John Ford Coley songs
Anne Murray songs
Song recordings produced by Jim Ed Norman
Capitol Records singles
1979 songs
Songs about heartache